The National Reform Party is a political party in Ghana. It was founded in 1999 by a splinter group from the National Democratic Congress (NDC).

Elections
The party contested the 2000 presidential and parliamentary elections on the 7 December 2000 but won no seats. Its presidential candidate Augustus Obuadum Tanoh ("Goosie" Tanoh) had 1.1% of the presidential vote. His running mate was Fetus Kosiba.

Electoral performance

Parliamentary elections

Presidential elections

Officials
The chairman and leader of the party is Peter Kpordugbe, former head of the National Service Secretariat and a former member of the NDC. The general secretary is Kyeretwie Opoku.

Motto
The party's motto is "Ghana first".

See also
List of political parties in Ghana

References

External links
Ghana Home Page
Goosie Obuadum Tanoh

1999 establishments in Ghana
Political parties established in 1999
Political parties in Ghana